Capital is a network of twelve independent contemporary hit radio stations in the United Kingdom, broadcasting a mix of local and networked programming. Nine of the stations are owned and operated by Global Media & Entertainment, while the other three are owned and operated under separate franchise agreements.

As of December 2022, the stations serve a combined weekly audience of 5.9 million listeners and target a core audience in the 15–34 age group; 57% of all listeners are within this demographic. The national version of the network is widely available on Global Player, Freeview, Sky, Freesat, Virgin Media and Digital One DAB. Capital is the fifth most-popular radio network in the UK by listeners, and the second largest of the commercial stations after Heart.

Capital has a  playlist which is updated weekly, and featured songs from the last one to two years in 2013. Unlike BBC Radio 1, Capital does not play rock or alternative music.

History

Capital Radio, GWR and GCap Media
Capital started as the independent music radio station for London in the early 1970s.

In the 1990s, Capital Radio became one of the UK's major radio groups via acquisition of a number of local radio stations including Red Dragon FM, BRMB and Power FM. Rival GWR Group also acquired a number of local radio stations in the 1990s, including Leicester Sound, Ram FM, GWR FM, Chiltern FM, Hereward FM, Marcher Sound and Trent FM, which operated as part of the 33-station Mix network.

Capital Radio and GWR Group's merger in 2005 to form GCap Media resulted in the stations being amalgamated into the One Network. This continued until June 2009 when most of the stations, now in the ownership of Global Radio — who had purchased GCap in 2008 — were rebranded as part of The Heart Network. This left Leicester Sound, Ram FM, Red Dragon FM and Trent FM which formed Hit Music with network content produced in Nottingham. In January 2011, these stations were rebranded as part of Capital, with the Leicester, Derby and Nottingham stations merged to form one regional station for the East Midlands.

Galaxy
The first Galaxy radio station, Galaxy 97.2, was launched in 1990 in South West England – initially broadcasting solely from Bristol – and operated under the Chiltern Radio Group. In 1994 the station won the first regional FM licence and moved frequency to 101.0 MHz, rebranded as Galaxy 101 and expanded coverage to include South Wales. At the same time a second studio was opened in Cardiff to provide some programming alongside the existing Bristol studio. Chrysalis Radio purchased the station in 1996 and, a year later, expanded the network by buying Faze FM's stations: Kiss 102 in Manchester and Kiss 105 in Yorkshire. In 1998, black community station Choice FM was acquired in Birmingham. Chrysalis Radio won the North East regional licence in 1999 and sold the original station, Galaxy 101, to the GWR Group in 2002 (this station is now Kiss 101).

In 2007, Chrysalis Radio was sold to Global Radio and following their subsequent acquisition of GCap in 2008, XFM Scotland and Power FM were rebranded under the Galaxy moniker in November 2008. Another rebrand followed in January 2011 when all Galaxy stations were rebranded as Capital.

Capital
Within the first five months of the network, Capital's flagship London station regained its position as the most listened-to commercial station in London. However, Manchester, the North East, South Wales and Yorkshire lost listeners, contrasting with Birmingham, Central Scotland and the South Coast where listening figures increased.

On 1 July 2011, Global Radio requested changes to the formats of Capital Birmingham and Capital Scotland, which had inherited obligations from previous owners. This was to enable format consistency within all nine Capital stations. On 17 November 2011, Ofcom approved both format change requests.

On 6 February 2014, Global Radio announced it would be selling two of its Capital stations, in Scotland and south Wales, to Communicorp. Capital's network programming and brand name is still used by both stations under contract.

Two ex-Heart stations were added to the network on 6 May 2014: Capital Cymru (serving Anglesey and Gwynedd) and Capital North West and Wales, broadcasting from Wrexham.

On 18 January 2016, Global added the former Juice FM station in Liverpool to the network, after approval was given to buy the station from UTV Media for £10 million.

In January 2018, Global added the former Juice 107.2 in Brighton and announced it would launch Capital Brighton on 3 September 2018.

In July 2018, Global brought 2BR in Lancashire from UKRD. The station was merged with the Manchester station and joined the network on 8 April 2019.

In February 2019, following Ofcom's decision to relax local content obligations from commercial radio, it was announced Capital would replace its local breakfast and weekend shows with additional networked programming from London as of Monday 8 April 2019. This reduces total weekly hours of local programming on each station from 43 to 15.

Capital Cymru retained its own local breakfast and weekend shows due to separate Welsh-language obligations. In May 2019, the station dropped all networked output and introduced a full schedule of local programming, including additional Welsh-language shows. Capital Cymru also retains the network's branding and much of its CHR music playlist.

Local Drivetime shows were retained, but some are now shared between stations. Local news, traffic updates and advertising is retained across all licence areas.

In September 2019, Quidem, the owners of six local radio stations in the English Midlands, announced it had entered a brand licensing agreement with Global, citing financial losses. Two months later, following Ofcom permission to change the stations' formats, it was confirmed they would merge and join the Capital network on 2 December 2019. Quidem continued to own Capital Mid-Counties as a franchise until August 2021 when Global took ownership, although Communicorp continues to own their franchises.

On 2 November 2022, Capital rebranded their stations to no longer use the word "FM" in their names; FM had already been removed from their on-air branding. The station logos with the Capital FM name and the station's frequency range were replaced with a blue and orange single-word logo, and Capital Xtra's branding had a colour change.

List of Capital stations
As of 2 December 2019, Capital's regional network consists of twelve stations.

Production and programming
Capital stations based in Central Scotland and Birmingham produced and transmitted specialist output for the network on Saturday and Sunday overnights respectively. However, in July 2012, this was replaced with content from 95.8 Capital studios in Leicester Square, London, where all the networked programming is now produced. Drivetime programming on weekdays originates from the local stations' studios. Capital also broadcasts via a number of DAB ensembles that do not correspond with a local FM station, and as an audio channel on the Digital Terrestrial Television and Digital Satellite platforms. These platforms take a national feed with programming (except adverts) identical to that of 95.8 Capital London.

Prior to January 2011, Leicester Sound, Ram FM and Trent FM shared off-peak programming from Trent's studios in Nottingham, whilst Galaxy programming came from studios in Leeds. Red Dragon FM and Capital were entirely autonomous, producing all of their own output.

The Capital radio network production and station sound was created by former Capital producer Arden Hanley and was then overseen by Chris Nicoll, who also runs production brand Wizz FX, until his departure in 2015 to join Wise Buddah. Howard Ritchie, Helen Austin and Kayne Harrison are the voiceover artists for 95-106 Capital.

Virgin Media became the first sponsor of 95-106 Capital. The six-figure deal begun on 4 January 2011, with weekday drive-time shows branded as The Virgin Media Home Run across all nine stations for a six-month period.

The Sky VIP Official Big Top 40, broadcast on Sundays, is simulcast with Capital's sister network, Heart.

News
All Capital stations broadcast local news updates under the name of Capital Reports, every hour from 5am to 7pm on weekdays and from 6am to noon at weekends.

Network opt-outs
 In Anglesey and Gwynedd, Capital Cymru broadcasts local programming 24 hours a day as part of its Welsh language requirements - including presenter-led shows from 6am – 7pm on weekdays and 9am – 4pm at weekends. Welsh language music features in its playlist and local news bulletins are broadcast in both Welsh and English. As of May 2019, the station does not carry any Capital networked programming, apart from The Sky VIP Official Big Top 40 on Sundays.
 The North Wales Coast, served by Capital North West and Wales on 96.3 FM, carries an hour-long Welsh-language music programme at 5am on Sunday–Friday mornings.
 Birmingham, served by Capital Midlands on 102.2 FM, carries a specialist show featuring Afro-Caribbean music on Friday mornings from 2am-4am, hosted by Capital Xtra host Robert Bruce.

Notable programmes and presenters 

Capital Breakfast with Roman Kemp, Chris Stark and Sian Welby
The Capital Evening Show with Jimmy Hill
The Capital Late Show with Sonny Jay
 Weekday early breakfast with Lauren Layfield
 The Capital Weekender with MistaJam

Sister stations

Capital Xtra

On 3 October 2013, Global Radio announced that the Capital brand will be extended to form a new nationwide digital rhythmic contemporary radio station by rebranding Choice FM as Capital Xtra. The rebrand took place at 6:01am on 7 October. Capital Xtra is available on FM in London on 96.9 and 107.1 MHz and nationally on the Digital One DAB multiplex. In September 2019, Capital Xtra received its own national sister station when Capital Xtra Reloaded - formerly an online stream through Global Player - was relaunched as a broadcast radio station, transmitting on Digital One in the DAB+ format and playing rhythmic hits from the recent past.

Capital Dance

On 1 October 2020, Global launched a new dedicated electronic dance music station broadcast nationally via Digital One in DAB+ and online. Capital Dance simulcasts the Capital network's Friday and Saturday night dance shows (The Capital Weekender) from 7pm to 1am on Friday and Saturday nights. The station has its own presented shows on Monday to Saturday afternoons and Monday to Thursday evenings, with former BBC Radio 1Xtra DJ MistaJam heading the station's lineup at launch. To enable the addition of Capital Dance to Digital One, other Global stations including Capital Xtra Reloaded and Capital UK had their DAB+ bitrate reduced.

Capital Chill
On 13 February 2023, Global launched Capital Chill to play exclusively chill music, via DAB and online.

Capital TV

Capital TV broadcast on the Sky and Freesat platforms from July 2012, and on Freeview in the Manchester area from October 2012, and was also available online. The channel played non-stop music videos. It closed in October 2018.

Capital FM Arena
The Capital FM Arena was in Nottingham, and was sponsored as part of a deal which began with the predecessor brand Trent FM. In 2016, the naming rights of the Capital FM Arena were handed over to Motorpoint and the arena is now known as Motorpoint Arena Nottingham.

Events

Every year, Capital holds the Summertime Ball event, held in June at Wembley Stadium, and the Jingle Bell Ball every December at the O2 Arena. Capital also hosts Fusion Festival UK which takes place every year in Liverpool in September.

Help a Capital Child
The Capital London charity Help a London Child was founded in 1975 by Richard Attenborough CBE. It is a grant-giving charity which means that twice a year, the charity provides practical and lasting support to groups working with thousands of youngsters aged 18 and under.

In the first year, £8,000 was raised and grants given to 10 charities in Camden. Since its formation, the charity has raised in excess of £22 million in the London area and awarded grants to areas of great need, directly helping over 1.4 million children and young people.

Grants are awarded to refuge and homelessness projects, support groups for children and young people with a disability, special need or an illness, as well as a range of sports, music, drama and leisure activities, holiday play schemes and residential breaks in the UK, cultural activities, supplementary schools, literacy programmes and much more.

It was the winner of Outstanding Contribution to London Lifestyle at the London Lifestyle Awards in 2010. In the same year, the charity allocated a record amount in grants (£1.6 million), supporting 84,000 children and young people across London where "you're never more than one mile away from a project supported by Help a Capital Child".

Help a Capital Child was launched as the main charity of the Capital Network. The first annual event took place from 14 to 16 October 2011 with sister station LBC 97.3 also adopting the charity appeal.

References

External links